HMS Victorious was a 74-gun third-rate ship of the line of the Royal Navy, launched at Bucklers Hard on 20 October 1808, five years after the previous  had been broken up.

Service history
Her first action came the year after her launch, as part of the Baltic Squadron, in which she assisted in the bombardment of the port of Flushing (Vlissingen) in what is now the Netherlands. The naval bombardment was just a part of a much larger operation; the land force consisted of some 30,000 men, and the objectives were simply to assist the Austrians by invading the Low Countries and to destroy the French Fleet at their believed location of Flushing.

The town of Flushing was actually seized, but the whole invasion soon became irrelevant and pointless, for the French Fleet had actually escaped to the port of Antwerp, and the Austrians had been defeated and were negotiating peace with the French. Over 4,000 British soldiers were killed during the expedition, 106 due to combat, the rest because of an illness known as Walcheren Fever.

Her deployment to the Mediterranean saw Victorious engage in her first skirmish against a French warship, on 22 February 1812 in the northern Adriatic Sea during Battle of Pirano, against the French , 74, which was eventually defeated with much of her crew being killed and wounded. Rivoli was captured once the skirmish came to an end and she later served in action as a Royal Navy warship against the French. Victorious won the lineage its first battle honour during this engagement.

She was escorting a 30-vessel West Indies-bound convoy.

Victorious served as part of Rear Admiral Sir George Cockburn's fleet in Chesapeake Bay during the War of 1812. She participated in the blockade of the Elizabeth River, keeping  at her berth in Norfolk, Virginia during the conflict.

The warship was decommissioned and placed in ordinary at Portsmouth Dockyard in March 1814. She was returned to service as a receiving ship in 1826, and broken up on 21 December 1861.

Notes

References

External links
 

Ships of the line of the Royal Navy
Swiftsure-class ships of the line
1808 ships
War of 1812 ships of the United Kingdom
Ships built on the Beaulieu River